Sir Robert Burdet (died 1333) was a Member of Parliament for Warwickshire and was Sheriff of Warwickshire.

Origins
He was the son of Hugh Burdet and was a nephew of Sir William Burdet of Loseby who represented Leicestershire in Parliament in 1297.

Career
He was summoned to Parliament for Warwickshire and Leicestershire in 1320, 1325 and 1327 and served as Sheriff from 1328 to 1329.

Marriage and children
He married Elizabeth de Camville, daughter and sole heiress of Sir Gerard de Camville, and by the marriage he inherited  the manors of Arrow and Seckington in Warwickshire. By his wife he had children including:
Sir Gerard Burdet (d. abt 1349), of Arrow, Warwickshire, eldest son and heir apparent, predeceased his father.
Sir Robert Burdet (born Seckington, 1345) of Bourton-on-Dunsmore, Warwickshire, eldest surviving son and heir. Ancestor of the Burdett baronets of Bramcote, Warwickshire (cr.1619).
Isabel Burdet who married Sir John Berkeley of Wymondham, Leicestershire

Notes

References

Bibliography
 
 
 
 
 

Year of birth unknown
1333 deaths
English MPs 1325
Anglo-Normans
English MPs 1320
Members of the Parliament of England for Leicestershire
English MPs 1327